Nicola Di Sanza (born January 27, 1990) is an Italian footballer playing with Santarcangiolese in the Promozione.

Playing career 
Di Sanza played in Serie D with F.C. Francavilla in 2008. In 2012, he played with A.S.D. Real Metapontino in the Eccellenza. He played abroad in the Canadian Soccer League with the York Region Shooters. He returned home in 2014 to play with ASD Rotunda Maris in the Promozione. He returned to the Canadian Soccer League for the 2015 season.

In 2016, he was transferred to Atlántico FC in the Liga Dominicana de Fútbol, where he played in the 2016 CFU Club Championship. Shortly after his contract was terminated he returned to the York Region Shooters for the remainder of the 2016 season. In 2017, he returned home to play with Santarcangiese, and in 2018 was signed by Paternicum.

References 

1990 births
Living people
Italian footballers
York Region Shooters players
Serie D players
Canadian Soccer League (1998–present) players
Association football forwards
Liga Dominicana de Fútbol players